Shallowford may refer to:
 Shallowford, Devon, England
 Shallowford, Staffordshire, England
 Shallowford, Tennessee, United States